The Maine Historical Society is the official state historical society of Maine. It is located at 489 Congress Street in downtown Portland.   The Society currently operates the Wadsworth-Longfellow House, a National Historic Landmark, Longfellow Garden, the Maine Historical Society Museum and Store, the Brown Research Library, as well as the Maine Memory Network, an online database of documents and images that includes resources from many of state's local historical societies.

History
The Maine Historical Society was founded in 1822 and is the third oldest state historical society after the Massachusetts Historical Society and New York Historical Society.  Influential members of the Maine Historical Society included many of Maine's Yankee philanthropists, such as James Phinney Baxter.

Presidents
William Willis, Mayor of Portland, was the president of the Maine Historical Society (1856–1865). Earle G. Shettleworth Jr., official State Historian of Maine, was president of MHS from 1977 to 1979.

Brown Library
The research library at the Maine Historical Society is named for John Marshall Brown and his wife Alida (Carroll) Brown. The current library building was built in 1907, designed by Alexander Wadsworth Longfellow, nephew of the poet Henry Wadsworth Longfellow, and is listed on the National Register of Historic Places. The library underwent an extensive renovation in 2007, at which time it was named for the Browns. Since 1822, the Maine Historical Society has maintained a library collection. The holdings are dedicated to the history of Maine and include books, archival material, maps, newspapers, photographs, as well as engineering and architectural drawings. The library also collects on family history, specifically Maine, early New England and eastern Canada.

Maine Historical Society Museum
The Maine Historical Society Museum is located at the Society's headquarters at 489 Congress Street, Portland. Topics for the changing exhibits include Maine's history, politics, culture, sports, religion, art, and business.

Collections of the Maine Historical Society 
First Series
 Collections of the Maine Historical Society, Vol. 1, 1865
 Collections of the Maine Historical Society, Vol. 2, 1847
 Collections of the Maine Historical Society, Vol. 3, 1853
 Collections of the Maine Historical Society, Vol. 4, 1856
 Collections of the Maine Historical Society, Vol.5, 1857
Collections of the Maine Historical Society, Vol. 6, 1858
 Collections of the Maine Historical Society, Vol. 7, 1859
 Collections of the Maine Historical Society, Vol. 8, 1881
 Collections of the Maine Historical Society, Vol. 9, 1887
Collections of the Maine Historical Society - Index Vol. 1-10

Second Series
 Collections of the Maine Historical Society, Second Series. Vol. 1, 1890
Collections of the Maine Historical Society, Second Series. Vol. 2
 Collections of the Maine Historical Society, Second Series. Vol. 3, 1892
 Collections of the Maine Historical Society, Second Series. Vol. 4, 1893
Collections of the Maine Historical Society, Second Series, Vol. 5 1894
 Collections of the Maine Historical Society, Second Series. Vol. 6, 1895
Collections of the Maine Historical Society, Second Series. Vol. 7
 Collections of the Maine Historical Society, Second Series. Vol. 10, 1899
Third Series
 Collections of the Maine Historical Society, Third Series. Vol. 1, 1901
 Collections of the Maine Historical Society, Third Series. Vol. 2, 1906

Documentary History of the State of Maine (1869–1916)
Also known as the Second Series, this series was published simultaneously as the Collections of the Maine Historical Society, which unfortunately also maintains its own second series.
Vol. 1
Vol. 2
Vol. 3 (Trelawny Papers)
Vol. 4 (1629–1689)
Vol. 5 (1689–1698)
Vol. 6 (1641–1689)
Vol. 7 (Farnham Papers)
Vol. 8 (Farnham Papers)
Vol. 9 (1689–1723)
Vol. 10 (1662–1729)
Vol. 11 (1729–1749)
Vol. 12 (1749–1755)
Vol. 13 (1755–1768)
Vol. 14 (1766–1777)
Vol. 15 (1777–1778)
Vol. 16 (1778–1779)
Vol. 17 (1777–1779)
Vol. 18 (1779–1780)
Vol. 19 (1780–1782)
Vol. 20 (1781–1785)
Vol. 21 (1785–1788)
Vol. 22 (1788–1791)
Vol. 23 (Native affairs)
Vol. 24 (Native affairs)

See also 
History of Maine
National Register of Historic Places listings in Portland, Maine
William Hutchinson Rowe, former board member

References

External links
Official Website
Henry Wadsworth Longfelllow
Maine Memory Network
Collections of the Maine Historical Society - Index Vol.1-10

1822 establishments in Maine
State historical societies of the United States
Historic preservation organizations in the United States
Libraries in Cumberland County, Maine
History of New England
History museums in Maine
Museums in Portland, Maine
Historical societies in Maine